Ruwayshid Air Base is a former Iraqi Air Force base in the Al-Anbar Governorate of Iraq.   It was captured by Coalition forces during the 2003 invasion of Iraq.

Overview
The airfield was a small dispersal airfield approximately 7 miles east of the Jordanian border in far western Iraq.  It was used by Iraqi Air Force elements based at H-3 Air Base, located 51.0 mi northeast of the airfield.  It was abandoned by the Iraqi Air Force after Operation Iraqi Freedom in March 2003.

Current aerial imagery shows that the operational structures around the airfield appear to have been demolished and removed.  Today the concrete runway and series of taxiways remain exposed and deteriorating to the elements, being reclaimed by the desert.

References

Iraqi Air Force bases
Military installations closed in 2003